Neowerdermannia vorwerkii, also known as achakana (Aymara and Quechua), is a species of cactus from high altitudes in Bolivia and northern Argentina.

References

Cacti of South America
Flora of Argentina
Flora of Bolivia
Plants described in 1930